Goldmine is the debut studio album from American country music singer Gabby Barrett. It was released on June 19, 2020, through Warner Music Nashville.

Content
Barrett told the blog Sounds Like Nashville that she had begun writing songs for the album in 2018 and 2019, with lead single "I Hope" having been written in late 2018. Pop singer Charlie Puth, after hearing the song, contacted Barrett on Instagram and offered to remix it with his own vocals. "I Hope" reached No. 1 on the Billboard Country Airplay chart dated April 25, 2020, and also topped the Billboard Country Streaming Songs chart, which made Barrett the first woman to score a No. 1 on that chart with her debut single. The song became a crossover hit after reaching the summit of the Billboard Country Airplay, Adult Pop Songs and all-format Radio Songs charts.

Ross Copperman and Zach Kale produced the entire album, with assistance on some tracks from Jimmy Robbins, Sam Martin, and Bryan Fowler. Contemporary Christian duo Shane & Shane are featured on "Got Me".

"The Good Ones" was released on June 8, 2020 as the album's second single. It became Barrett's second No. 1 hit on the Billboard Country Airplay chart, where it spent three weeks at the top, marking the longest run at No. 1 for a female artist since Miranda Lambert's "The House That Built Me" in 2010.

"Footprints on the Moon" was released as the album's third single on June 28, 2021. It reached a peak of number 48 on the Billboard Country Airplay chart.

Critical reception
Stephen Thomas Erlewine of AllMusic found the album's sound "draped in a digital gloss designed to appeal to a number of different demographics". He also thought that Barrett's presence as a cowriter on all but one song helped to establish her musical identity. Brian Mansfield gave the album a largely positive review for Variety, comparing Barrett's vocals favorably to those of Carrie Underwood while also praising the hooks written in songs such as "The Good Ones" and "Hall of Fame".

Commercial performance
Goldmine debuted at number four on the Billboard Top Country Albums chart, earning 20,000 equivalent album units. The album garnered 15.98 million on-demand streams in its opening week, breaking the record for the largest streaming week ever for a debut country album by a woman. Upon its release, global first day streams of the album on Amazon Music surpassed those for any previous debut country album on the platform.

Track listing

Personnel
Adapted from liner notes.

Vocals
Trannie Anderson – background vocals (tracks 3, 8, 9)
Gabby Barrett – lead vocals (all tracks), background vocals (track 12)
Ross Copperman – background vocals (tracks 3, 5)
Zach Kale – background vocals (all tracks except 5 & 6)
Charlie Puth – duet vocals (track 13)
Rozes – background vocals (tracks 4, 12)
Shane & Shane – featuring vocals (track 10)

Musicians and production
Jacob Arnold – drums (track 8)
Shane Bernard – guitar (track 10)
Ross Copperman – guitar (tracks 3, 5, 7, 12), keyboards (tracks 3, 5, 12), programming (tracks 3, 5, 6, 12)
Adam Doleac – guitar (track 9)
Dan Fernandez – bass guitar (track 4), guitar (track 4)
Cade Foehner – guitar (tracks 3, 4, 8)
Bryan Fowler – guitar (track 10), keyboards (track 10), programming (track 10)
Jonny Fung – banjo (tracks 4, 12), bass guitar (tracks 3, 8, 9), guitar (tracks 3, 4, 8, 9, 12), programming (tracks 3, 4, 8, 9, 12)
Caleb Gilbreath – drums (tracks 1, 13), percussion (track 4)
Adam Griffith – guitar (tracks 6, 11)
Zach Kale – guitar (tracks 1, 2, 4, 7-9, 11-13), keyboards (tracks 1, 4, 7-9, 13), programming (tracks 1, 2, 4, 7-13)
Sam Martin – guitar (track 6), keyboards (tracks 6, 11), programming (tracks 6, 11)
Buckley Miller – programming (track 9)
Spence Peppard – guitar (track 8)
Danny Rader – guitar (tracks 7, 13)
Jimmy Robbins – guitar (track 2), programming (track 2)
Derek Wells – guitar (track 1)
Alex Wright – keyboards (all tracks except 5 & 6)
Nir Z. – drums (tracks 4, 10)

Charts

Weekly charts

Year-end charts

Certifications

References

2020 debut albums
Gabby Barrett albums
Warner Records albums
Albums produced by Ross Copperman